Ötüken ("Ötüken forest", 𐰵𐱅𐰜𐰤:𐰘𐰼, Ötüken jer, "Land of Ötüken", Old Uyghur: 𐰵𐱅𐰜𐰤:𐰘𐰃𐱁 Ötüken yïš) was the capital of the First Turkic Khaganate and Uyghur Khaganate. It has an important place in Turkic mythology and Tengrism. Otukan (Ötüken) is also one of the names given to Mother Earth. Otuken is located in Kharkhorin district in Övörkhangai Province of present-day Mongolia.

Ordu-Baliq was built on the ruins of the Göktürk imperial capital.

Otuken and nature 
According to this ancient belief, the mood of the Yer-sub and Ötüken could be seen in the trees' condition. If the trees are healthy and strong and are bearing a lot of fruit, it is believed that Ötüken is satisfied with humans. A prayer dedicated to Ötüken was once directed to a grand tree.

Otugan existed in the middle of the Universe and her residence was in Central Asia on Khangan Plateau. This place was called "The Otuken (Ötüken) Homeland".

Mountain 
The word was used to describe the sacred mountain of the ancient Turks. It was mentioned by Bilge Khagan in the Orkhon inscriptions as "the place from where the tribes can be controlled". A force called qut was believed to emanate from this mountain, granting the local potentate the divine right to rule all the Turkic tribes.

Although never identified precisely, Ötüken probably stretched "from the Khangai Range of Central Mongolia to the Sayan Mountains of Tuva, at the centre of which is the Orkhon Valley", which for centuries was regarded as the seat of the imperial power of the steppes.

Old records 
 Dīwān Lughāt al-Turk

Dīwān Lughāt al-Turk, by Mahmud al-Kashgari; "Ötüken (اتوكان) is a name of a place in the deserts of land of Tatars. It's close to land of Uyghurs."

Orkhon Inscriptions

The inscriptions clearly show the sacred importance of the region, as evidenced by the statement of Tonyukuk: "If you stay in the land of the Ötüken, and send caravans from there, you will have no trouble. If you stay at the Ötüken Mountains, you will live forever dominating the tribes!"

See also
 Etugen Eke

References

Bibliography
 C. E. Bosworth: Artikel „ÖTÜKEN“ in: Encyclopaedia of Islam; Leiden. Digitale Edition

History of Mongolia
Religion in Mongolia
Turkic mythology
Xueyantuo